KODAM IV/Diponegoro or IV Military Regional Command/Diponegoro is a military area command (effectively a military district) of the Indonesian Army. It covers the provinces of Central Java and Special Region of Yogyakarta on the island of Java. It is named after the Java War hero Prince Diponegoro. It appears to have been first established in 1950, and inherited the heritage of the former 3rd Diponegoro Division and other Central Java infantry units. Diponegoro Division personnel have been very significant in the history of the Indonesian Army. Among its early officers were Sarwo Edhie Wibowo, who served as battalion and regimental commander in the division from 1945-53. Former commanders of the division include Soeharto, a former president of Indonesia. Divisional personnel, including Lieutenant Colonel Untung Syamsuri, were involved in the 30 September Movement events of 1965. Former president Susilo Bambang Yudhoyono was also member of this KODAM when he took command of KOREM 072/Pamungkas at Yogyakarta during his military tenure.

As of 1965, the Diponegoro Division had three infantry brigades, the 4th/Dewa Ratna, 5th/Lukitasari, and 6th/Tri Shakti Balajaya. The headquarters of the 4th is located in Tegal, Central Java, the 5th was in Semarang, Central Java, and 6th was in Solo, Central Java. Among those three, the 4th is the currently active brigade, after the disbanding of the 5th and transfer of the 6th to Kostrad.

Territorial units 
Today Kodam IV includes the Military Area Commands - Korem 071/Wijayakusuma at Purwokerto, Korem 072/Pamungkas at Yogyakarta, Korem 073/Makutarama at Salatiga, and  Korem 074/Warastratama at Solo, Central Java, as well as the 4th Infantry Brigade at Tegal, Central Java. All Korems are commanded by an army colonel, however, as part of the Army restructuring program, Korem 072/Pamungkas is presently commanded by a brigadier general, stating that it is the only Korem overseeing a whole province.

1. Korem 071/Wijayakusuma (WK) in Purwokerto
 Kodim 0701/Banyumas
 Kodim 0702/Purbalingga
 Kodim 0703/Cilacap
 Kodim 0704/Banjar Negara
 Kodim 0710/Pekalongan
 Kodim 0711/Pemalang
 Kodim 0712/Tegal
 Kodim 0713/Brebes
 Kodim 0736/Batang
2. Korem 072/Pamungkas (PMK) in Yogyakarta
 Kodim 0705/Magelang
 Kodim 0706/Temanggung
 Kodim 0707/Wonosobo
 Kodim 0708/Purworejo
 Kodim 0709/Kebumen
 Kodim 0729/Bantul
 Kodim 0730/Gunung Kidul
 Kodim 0731/Kulon Progo
 Kodim 0732/Sleman
 Kodim 0734/Yogyakarta
3. Korem 073/Makutarama (MKT) in Salatiga
 Kodim 0714/Salatiga
 Kodim 0715/Kendal
 Kodim 0716/Demak
 Kodim 0717/Purwodadi
 Kodim 0718/Pati
 Kodim 0719/Jepara
 Kodim 0720/Rembang
 Kodim 0721/Blora
 Kodim 0722/Kudus
4. Korem 074/Warastratama (WRS) in Surakarta
 Kodim 0723/Klaten
 Kodim 0724/Boyolali
 Kodim 0725/Sragen
 Kodim 0726/Sukoharjo
 Kodim 0727/Karang Anyar
 Kodim 0728/Wonogiri
 Kodim 0735/Surakarta
5. Kodim 0733/Semarang (BS) in Semarang

Combat Units & Support Combat Units
 Combat Units
 4th Infantry Brigade/Dewa Ratna
 Brigade HQ
 405th Infantry Battalion/Suryakusuma
 406th Infantry Battalion/Candrakusuma
 407th Infantry Battalion/Padmakusuma
 400th Raider Infantry Battalion/Banteng Raider
 403rd Infantry Battalion/Wirasada Pratista (under Korem 072)
 408th Raider Infantry Battalion/Suhbrasta (under Korem 074)
 410th Infantry Battalion/Alugoro (under Korem 073)
 Combat Support Units
 2nd Cavalry Battalion/Turangga Ceta (Yonkav 2/Tank)
 2nd  Cavalry Company/Jayeng Rata Toh Raga
 3rd Field Artillery Battalion/Nagapakca (Yon Armed 3/105 Tarik)
 15th Air Defense Artillery Battalion/Dahana Bhaladika Yudha
 4th Combat Engineering Battalion/Tanpa Kwandaya

Notes

References
  The 'Cornell Paper.' Initial analysis of 1965 'coup attempt,' later controversial

External links
 http://www.kodam4.mil.id/PoradVI/menu.html - Command official website

04
Central Java
Diponegoro
Military units and formations established in 1950
Indonesian Army